Babarganj  is a village development committee in Sarlahi District in the Janakpur Zone of south-eastern Nepal. At the time of the 1991 Nepal census it had a population of 7,405 people living in 1,353 individual households. This village is the birthplace of political leader Rajendra Mahato , Dr. BinayThakur, Dr.Raju Ray and Mukesh Thakur.

References

External links
UN map of the municipalities of Sarlahi  District

Populated places in Sarlahi District